Cheez Doodles are a cheese puff produced by Wise Foods. Originally developed and manufactured in 1964 by King Kone Corp. of the Bronx, New York, it became the prevalent cheese puff snack on the East Coast.

Description 
Cheez Doodles are a cheese-flavored baked cheese puff made of extruded cornmeal and are similar to Frito-Lay's Cheetos and Herr Foods Cheese Curls. The snack was created by Morrie Yohai and is produced by Pennsylvania-based snack foods producer Wise Foods.

History 
Originally developed and manufactured by King Kone Corp. of the Bronx, Cheez Doodles were developed by the company's owner and operator, Morrie Yohai (1920–2010). King Kone had been founded in the 1920s and manufactured ice cream cones, cheese crackers, popcorn, and Melba toast. In the early 1960s, the company had a machine which could be used to produce three-inch lengths of extruded cornmeal. These were then baked with orange cheddar cheese powder and other flavorings to produce a new snack food. According to Yohai, the name "Cheez Doodles" came to him while he and other employees were sitting around a table sampling alternatives for the cheese flavoring of the new snack.

In the mid-1960s, the company (by then known as Old London Foods) was acquired by Borden and assigned to its Wise potato chip division. In 1997, KKR & Co. acquired a majority interest in Borden; in 2002, Palladium Equity Partners purchased Wise Foods.

Today, Wise Foods is owned by Arca Continental, the second-largest Coca-Cola bottler in Central and North America, who bought Wise in 2012. Cheez Doodles remain one of the strongest brands marketed by Wise with 15 million pounds of the product produced in 2010.

Varieties 

Cheez Doodles are produced in many varieties. Varieties available  were:
 Cheez Doodles Baked Puffs – original variety
 Cheez Doodles Baked Puffs White Cheddar – white cheddar puffed rather than yellow cheddar
 Cheez Doodles Baked Puffs Hot & Honey – honey and cheddar flavored
 Cheez Doodles Baked Puffs Honey BBQ – honey barbecue sauce flavored
 Cheez Doodles Baked Puffs Extra Cheesy – additional yellow cheddar cheese flavoring
 Cheez Doodles Extra Crunchy – hard, crunchy fried variety
 Cheez Doodles Baked Puffed Balls – spherical puff variety
 Cheez Doodles Baked Puffed Balls Jalapeño Poppers – spherical puffs with yellow cheddar with jalapeño flavoring

Formerly available varieties included:
 Croc-o-Doodles – crocodile-shaped puffed snacks
 Cheez Doodles Crunchy – hard, crunchy fried variety
 Cheez Doodles Crunchy, Reduced Fat – lower fat version of the hard, crunchy variety
 Cheez Doodle-O's – circle-shaped hard, crunchy snacks

In popular culture 
In the comic strip Big Nate, Cheez Doodles are protagonist Nate Wright's favorite snack food.

Cheez Doodles are prominently featured in George R. R. Martin's short story, The Pear-shaped Man.

References

External links 
 Official website
 Cheese Doodles day 5th of March (Scandinavia)

Brand name snack foods
Products introduced in 1948
American snack foods